Sylvester is a 1985 American family drama film directed by Tim Hunter and starring Richard Farnsworth and Melissa Gilbert. The film was nominated for a Young Artist Award in 1986.

Plot

A young woman called Charlie cares for a horse brought to a livestock auction yard and helps turn him into a champion jumper.

Cast
Richard Farnsworth as Foster
Melissa Gilbert as Charlie
Michael Schoeffling as Matt
Constance Towers as Muffy
Peter Kowanko as Harris
Arliss Howard as Peter
James Gammon as Steve

Production
The film was filmed on location in Marfa and Alpine, Texas, and at the Kentucky Horse Park in Lexington, Kentucky in the summer of 1984.

One of the horses to play Sylvester was The Gray Goose. His handler Kim Walnes doubled for Gilbert in the action shots at the Kentucky Horse Park.

Soundtrack
Three songs by the Textones (Carla Olson, Phil Seymour, George Callins, Joe Read and Tom Jr Morgan) are heard in the film: "Number One Is to Survive", "It's a Matter of Time" and "It's Okay".

References

External links

 Flixster - Sylvester 1985
 New York Times, Melissa Gilbert in 'Sylvester', March 15, 1985

1985 films
Columbia Pictures films
American drama films
1985 drama films
Films directed by Tim Hunter
Films scored by Lee Holdridge
Films about horses
Films shot in Texas
Films shot in Kentucky
Films set in Texas
1980s English-language films
1980s American films
Films with screenplays by Carol Sobieski